Susan Barse Miller (c. 1876 - January 11, 1935) was an American painter. She was a member of the Laguna Beach Art Association.

References

1870s births
1935 deaths
American women painters
20th-century American painters
20th-century American women artists